This topic covers notable events and articles related to 2013 in music.

Specific locations

Specific genres

Albums released

Highest critically reviewed albums (Metacritic)

Awards

Bands formed

 Band-Maid
 Beach Slang
 Big Data
 Blossoms
 Brothers Osborne
 BTS
 Bully
 The Cadillac Three
 Cherry Glazerr
 Childbirth
 Crying
 Fight or Flight
 From Ashes to New
 Great Good Fine Ok
 G.R.L.
 I Prevail
 Japanese Breakfast
 Joe Russo's Almost Dead
 Julian Casablancas+The Voidz
 Let's Eat Grandma
 Little Big
 Lisa Prank
 Mrs. Green Apple
 The Pizza Underground
 Pup
 The Rails
 Rae Sremmurd
 Rainbow Kitten Surprise
 Rolling Blackouts Coastal Fever
 Royal Blood
 Run the Jewels
 Sorority Noise
 Sunflower Bean
 Sylvan Esso
 Viola Beach
 You Are Number Six
 Zeal & Ardor

Bands reformed

All Saints
Black Flag
The Calling
Danity Kane
Daughters
Failure
The Fall of Troy
Fall Out Boy
Jurassic 5
King Crimson
Medicine
Neutral Milk Hotel
Nine Inch Nails
The Postal Service
Rocket from the Crypt
Story of the Year
TLC
Violent Femmes

Bands disbanded

A Life Once Lost
A Tribe Called Quest
Allstar Weekend
A Rocket to the Moon
Asobi Seksu
Attack Attack!
Azari & III
The Calling
The Chariot
Charlie Brown Jr.
Churchill
The Click Five
Comadre
Dolly Rockers
Dr. Acula
E for Explosion
Gifts From Enola
Girls Aloud
Go Radio
God Forbid
Great Big Sea
Honor Society
Jonas Brothers
Kid Dynamite
Klymaxx
Lostprophets
Madina Lake
The Mars Volta
My Chemical Romance
New Boyz
The New Power Generation
The Postal Service
S.C.U.M
Sharks
Static-X
Sunny Day Real Estate
Supercute!
Swedish House Mafia
Tribes
Underoath
Weapon
Wild Flag
Woe, Is Me

Deaths

January
1 – Patti Page (85), American pop and country music singer
4 – Sammy Johns (66), American country music singer-songwriter
11 – John Wilkinson, 67, American guitarist (Elvis Presley's TCB Band) and singer
19 – Steve Knight (77), American musician (Mountain)
21 – Bob Dawdy (70), American rock and roll guitarist (The Velaires)
26 – Leroy "Sugarfoot" Bonner (69), American funk singer and guitarist (Ohio Players)
30 – Patty Andrews (94), American singer (The Andrews Sisters)

February
 4 – Reg Presley (71), British singer and songwriter (The Troggs)
 6 – Mo-Do (46), Italian musician
 11
 Rick Huxley (72), English musician (The Dave Clark Five)
 Kevin Peek (66), Australian musician (Sky)
 16
 Stanley Knight (64), American guitarist (Black Oak Arkansas)
 Tony Sheridan (72), English rock and roll singer, early collaborator with The Beatles
 18
 Kevin Ayers (68), English psychedelic rock songwriter and musician (Soft Machine)
 Damon Harris (62), American soul and R&B singer (The Temptations)
 27 – Van Cliburn (78), American pianist

March
1 – Jewel Akens (79), American R&B singer
3 – Bobby Rogers (73), American soul singer and songwriter (The Miracles)
6 - Alvin Lee (68), English blues-rock guitarist (Ten Years After)
7
 Kenny Ball (82), English jazz trumpeter
 Peter Banks (65), English rock guitarist (Yes, Flash)
 Claude King (90), American country music singer

April
 3 – Chris Bailey (62), Australian bass guitarist (The Angels)
 8 – Annette Funicello (70), American actress (The Mickey Mouse Club) and singer
 9 – Emilio Pericoli (85), Italian singer
 21 – Chrissy Amphlett (53), Australian singer (Divinyls)
 22
 Richie Havens (72), American folk singer and guitarist
 Nathaniel Romerson (75), American R&B singer (The Ballads)
 26 – George Jones (81), American country music singer and songwriter

May
 1 – Chris Kelly (34), American rap artist (Kris Kross)
 7
 Peter Rauhofer (48), Austrian DJ, remixer and record producer
 Romanthony (45), American DJ, record producer and singer
 17 – Alan O'Day (72), American singer-songwriter
 18 – Marek Jackowski (66), Polish rock musician (Maanam)
 20
 Ray Manzarek (74), American rock musician (The Doors)
 Zach Sobiech (18), American pop singer and viral video performer
 21 – Trevor Bolder (62), British musician (David Bowie, Uriah Heep)
 24 – Lorene Mann (76), American country music singer and songwriter
 25 – Tyrone Brunson (57), American musician

June
1 - Richard Raines (48), American guitarist (Perfect Stranger)
 4 – Joey Covington (67), American musician (Jefferson Airplane)
 5 – Don Bowman (75), American comedian, country singer and songwriter
 14 – Tom Tall (75), American rockabilly singer
 15 – Robert Morris "B.J." Jones (70), American rock guitarist (Sweathog)
 19 – Slim Whitman (90), American country singer-songwriter
 21 – Mary Love (69), American soul and gospel singer
 23 – Bobby Bland (83), American blues and soul singer
 24
 Sammy Hall, 67, American garage rock singer (The Birdwatchers)
 Puff Johnson (40), American pop singer and songwriter
 Alan Myers (58), American rock drummer (Devo)

July
 4 – Bernie Nolan (52), Irish singer (The Nolans) and actress
 13 – Cory Monteith (31), Canadian actor (Glee) and singer
 21 – WanBi Tuấn Anh (26), Vietnamese singer, musician, actor and model
 26 – J.J. Cale (74), American guitarist, singer, and songwriter

August
 5 – George Duke (67), American jazz fusion keyboardist
 8 – Jack Clement (82), American record and film producer, songwriter and singer
 10 – Eydie Gormé (84), American singer
 13
 Jon Brookes (44), English rock drummer (The Charlatans)
 Tompall Glaser (79), American country music singer
 14 – Allen Lanier (67), American rock keyboardist and guitarist (Blue Öyster Cult)

September
 9 – Forrest (60), American singer
 12 – Joan Regan (85), British traditional pop singer
 15 – Jackie Lomax (69), English guitarist and singer-songwriter
 16 – Mac Curtis (74), American rockabilly singer
 17 – Marvin Rainwater (88), American country and rockabilly singer
 25 – Billy Mure (97), American guitarist

October
 8
 Larry Verne (77), American singer
 Philip Chevron (56), Irish musician (The Pogues)
 10
 Jan Kuehnemund (51), American musician (Vixen)
 Cal Smith (81), American country music singer
 19 – Noel Harrison (79), British singer and actor 
 20 – Leon Ashley (77), American country music singer
 26 – Al Johnson (65), American soul singer (The Unifics)
 27 – Lou Reed (71), American rock musician and songwriter (The Velvet Underground)
 30 – Pete Haycock (62), English guitarist (Climax Blues Band)
 31 – Bobby Parker (76), American blues-rock guitarist

November
 2 – Jack Alexander (77), Scottish folk singer and pianist (The Alexander Brothers)
 6 – Clyde Stacy (77), American rockabilly singer and guitarist
 11 – Bob Beckham (86), American music publisher and country singer
 29
 Dick Dodd (68), American musician (The Bel-Airs, The Standells)
 Oliver Cheatham (65), American R&B singer

December
 2 – Junior Murvin (67), Jamaican reggae singer
 16 – Ray Price (87), American country music singer
 23 – Yusef Lateef (93), American saxophonist

See also 
 Timeline of musical events
 Women in music
 2013 in television

References

 
2013-related lists
Music by year